Baluchabad-e Kahnaki (also Romanized as Balūchābād-e Kahnakī; also known as Balūchābād) is a village in Eskelabad Rural District, Nukabad District, Khash County, Sistan and Baluchestan Province, Iran. At the 2006 census, its population was 26, in 7 families.

References 

Populated places in Khash County